Singles is a compilation album by the American ska punk band Fishbone. It was released on October 22, 1993.

Track listing

References

Liner notes to Fishbone Singles, 1993.

Fishbone albums
1993 compilation albums